Michael Lee Ivins (born March 17, 1963, in Omaha, Nebraska) is the former bassist, keyboardist, backing vocalist and founding member of The Flaming Lips.

Along with Mark Coyne and Wayne Coyne, he formed The Flaming Lips in 1983 in Oklahoma City, Oklahoma. According to frontman Coyne, Ivins was found as the bassist for the band because of his punk-rock look, and not because of his musical ability. In fact, Ivins initially couldn't play bass, but he learned how and was bassist for the band for 38 years, until 2021. Ivins developed an interest in the recording process and helped engineer the Flaming Lips' studio recordings starting in 1994, ending with 2020’s American Head. Ivins has also been credited with working with artists such as Mastodon, Ben Folds Five, The Bad Plus, The Postal Service and The Holy Fire. 

Ivins often wears a full-body skeleton suit commonly recognized as a Halloween costume in tribute to John Entwistle (he wore this costume when The Flaming Lips performed at the 2008 VH1 Rock Honors, which paid tribute to The Who). In recent years, he is more commonly seen wearing СССР T-shirts.

On August 20, 2021, Wayne Coyne confirmed in a post on Instagram that Ivins is no longer in the band. The reason for his departure has not been publicly announced.

During the second half of 2022, Ivins began to appear in instagram clips advertising a new group he is in with guitarist/vocalist Julia Kean called the Lolly Bombs.

References

External links
 Interview with Michael Ivins on public radio program The Sound of Young America

American rock bass guitarists
American male bass guitarists
1963 births
Living people
Musicians from Omaha, Nebraska
The Flaming Lips members
Guitarists from Oklahoma
20th-century American guitarists